Michael E. Haynes (May 9, 1927 – September 12, 2019) was an American minister and politician in the state of Massachusetts. His parents, Gustavus and Edna, were immigrants from Barbados.

He was educated at Boston English High School, graduating in 1944, Shelton State Community College and earned his bachelor's degree from New England School of Theology in 1949. He served in the Massachusetts House of Representatives from 1965 to 1968, representing Roxbury, Massachusetts. Haynes was appointed to the state parole board by Governor Francis Sargent. He was also a member of the Boston Mayor's Committee on Violence and the Attorney General's Advisory Committee on Drug Addiction. He was pastor at Twelfth Baptist Church in Roxbury from 1964 to 2004.
  
During the 1960s and 1970s Haynes played an active role in the civil rights movement. In 1965, he helped plan Martin Luther King Jr.'s entrance into Boston when he came to speak on Boston Common that spring. The major focus of King's speech on April 23 was school desegregation in Boston.

The Haynes Early Education school located in Roxbury was named in his honor.

On November 9, 2006, Northeastern University President Joseph E. Aoun met with members of the Black Ministerial Alliance of Massachusetts at the People's Baptist Church (830 Tremont Street, Boston) to discuss possible collaborations between Northeastern and Lower Roxbury clergy. During the meeting, Reverend Michael E. Haynes suggested the University create a history of the African American community in Lower Roxbury. As a result, President Aoun appointed Joseph D. Warren, at that time Special Assistant to the Director of Government Relations and Community Affairs, to oversee the Lower Roxbury Black History Project. Warren appointed an advisory board consisting of Rev. Michael E. Haynes, formerly of Roxbury's Twelfth Baptist Church, Massachusetts State Representative Byron Rushing, Northeastern University Archivist Joan D. Krizack, and Northeastern University history professors.

An older brother is the renowned jazz drummer Roy Haynes.

Michael Haynes died on September 12, 2019.

See also
 1965–1966 Massachusetts legislature
 1969-1970 Massachusetts legislature

References

1927 births
2019 deaths
20th-century American politicians
African-American state legislators in Massachusetts
Clergy from Boston
Politicians from Boston
Shelton State Community College alumni
Baptist ministers from the United States
Activists from Massachusetts
Democratic Party members of the Massachusetts House of Representatives
20th-century African-American politicians
21st-century African-American people